Uithuizen is a village in the Dutch province of Groningen. It is located in the municipality of Het Hogeland. It had a population of 4,885 in January 2017.

The Uithuizen railway station is located on the Sauwerd–Roodeschool railway.

History
Uithuizen was first mentioned in 1000 as Uthuson (extreme houses). Around 1200, a dike was built to protect the village. In the mid-19th century, Uithuizen started to grow substantially.

In the village is a borg called the Menkemaborg.
Menkemaborg at Uithuizen is a 14th-century, brick-built country house, which was substantially altered around 1700. Since then it has since barely been changed. The Alberda family, the 18th-century occupants, commissioned artists to decorate the interior with impressive chimney-pieces carved with baroque ornaments, and paintings of mythological scenes. The Menkemaborg and its gardens are open to the public.

On 17 May 2008, Cardinal Simonis opened the Trail of St James, connecting Uithuizen to Hasselt, Le Puy en Velay, and Santiago de Compostela, creating a modern, northern branch of the Way of St James.

Uithuizen was a separate municipality until 1979, when it became part of Hefshuizen.

Economy
The Uithuizen Gas Plant processes natural gas to the north of the town, on the Dutch coast.

Notable people
Seth Gaaikema (1939–2014), cabaret artist and writer
Frederik Engel Jeltsema (1879–1971), painter and sculptor
Frits Peutz (1896–1974), architect

Sport

Cycling
Uithuizen hosted the finish of stage 4 at the 2013 Energiewacht Tour.

References

External links

Site of Windmill De liefde
Menkemaborg (english)

Het Hogeland
Populated places in Groningen (province)
Former municipalities of Groningen (province)